The plantar arch is a circulatory anastomosis formed from:
 deep plantar artery, from the dorsalis pedis - a.k.a. dorsal artery of the foot
 lateral plantar artery

The plantar arch supplies the underside, or sole, of the foot.

The plantar arch runs from the 5th metatarsal and extends medially to the 1st metatarsal (of the big toe).

The arch is formed when the lateral plantar artery turns medially to the interval between the bases of the first and second metatarsal bones, where it unites with the deep plantar branch of the dorsalis pedis artery, thus completing the plantar arch (or deep plantar arch).

References

External links
 http://www.dartmouth.edu/~humananatomy/figures/chapter_17/17-3.HTM

Arteries of the lower limb